Lee Min-young (born February 6, 1976) is a South Korean actress. Lee began her career as a child actress when she was four years old, and appeared steadily in television dramas. After a five-year hiatus, she returned to acting in 2011 with Kimchi Family, followed by You're Only Mine in 2014.

Lee married actor Lee Chan on December 10, 2006, but the couple divorced after 12 days, with Lee suing her husband for domestic violence that she said caused her miscarriage and a broken nose which required reconstructive surgery. Lee Chan was sentenced to one year in prison, suspended for two years.

Filmography

Television series

Film

Variety show

Discography

Singles

Awards and nominations

References

External links
 
 
 

1976 births
Living people
South Korean child actresses
South Korean television actresses
South Korean film actresses
Dankook University alumni